Amirhossein Hosseinzadeh (born 30 October 2000) is an Iranian footballer who plays as a winger for Belgian First Division A club Charleroi.

Club career

Saipa
He made his debut for Saipa in 17th fixtures of 2018–19 Iran Pro League against Paykan while he substituted in for Arash Rezavand.

Charleroi
On 22 August 2022, Hosseinzadeh signed a contract with Charleroi in Belgium for the term of two years, with two additional annual options.

International career
He made his debut on 24 March 2022 against Korea Republic. In his second game for Iran national football team, he played against the Lebanese team on 29 march 2022.

Honours

Esteghlal 

Iran Pro League: 2021–22

References

External links 
 

Living people
2000 births
Association football midfielders
Saipa F.C. players
Esteghlal F.C. players
R. Charleroi S.C. players
Persian Gulf Pro League players
Belgian Pro League players
Iranian expatriate footballers
Expatriate footballers in Belgium
Iranian expatriate sportspeople in Belgium
Iranian footballers